(born  on June 10, 1977) is a Japanese actress and pop singer.

Personal life 
Matsu was born to a family of buyō and kabuki actors, including her father Matsumoto Hakuō II, her mother and businesswoman Noriko Fujima, her uncle, Nakamura Kichiemon II, her elder brother Matsumoto Kōshirō X, her sister Kio Matsumoto, and stage director Kazuhisa Kawahara. She married guitarist and record producer Yoshiyuki Sahashi on December 28, 2007. She has the name of Natori of the Matsumoto school of Nippon Buyō (Japanese dancing); . She chose the surname "Matsu" to honor the family. In an interview, she said she and her siblings are close to their mother.

Career 
Matsu starred in her stage debut Ninjō-banashi: Bunshichi Mottoi at Kabuki-za. Her first television role was in the NHK Drama Hana no Ran and starred in the NHK drama Kura. Because Shirayuri Gakuen, her high school, prohibited working in the industry, she moved to Horikoshi High School. Matsu starred in the drama Long Vacation after matriculating to college. She had a supporting role, but established in full-scale her position, because the drama was a major hit. She hosted the 47th NHK Kōhaku Uta Gassen and debuted with the single "Ashita, Haru ga Kitara". She returned to the show as a singer on the last day of the year. In an interview with NHK, Matsu recalled the incident with her musical debut. She sang karaoke which was heard by the director who suggested she gave a song. Although she declined it and was not confident enough with the song, she accepted because she saw it as "[a] chance that not everyone got".

In the same year, she starred in the drama Love Generation in a leading role. She starred in Hero. She published a photo essay book, Matsu no Hitorigoto, through Asahi Shimbun Publishers. She released "Toki no Fune" in September 2004, which was composed by Akeboshi. It is similar to the song, "A nine days' wonder", which was released after the "Toki no Fune" single. The single contained a cover of Akeboshi's "White Reply" previously recorded on her sixth album, Harvest Songs.

Matsu won the Best Actress of the Year of the 29th Hochi Film Award and the 28th Japan Academy Prize at the same time for The Hidden Blade. In July 2006, she and Takuya Kimura starred in a special one-night edition of Hero. In October 2006, Matsu and Makoto Fujita starred in a weekly drama Yakusha Damashii. Matsu left the third concert tour in May 2007 to commemorate her tenth year as a singer. In her album Cherish You, the song "Ashita Haru ga Kitara" was redone to combine her voice on her youth.

On November 27, 2014, Matsu revealed on her official website that she was pregnant with her first child. Her daughter was born on March 30, 2015, and had 3466 grams. On February 9, 2020, Matsu was called to join Idina Menzel, Aurora and eight more of Elsa's international dubbers to perform the song “Into the Unknown” at the 92nd Academy Awards. Every international performer sang one line of the song in a different languages, including Maria Lucia Rosenberg, Willemijn Verkaik, Carmen Sarahí, Lisa Stokke, Katarzyna Łaska, Anna Buturlina, Gisela and Wichayanee Pearklin. Matsu worked with the producers. Her third album, Sakura no Ame, Itsuka was released at Universal Music.

Filmography

Film 
{| class="wikitable sortable"
|-
! Year
! Title
! Role
! class="unsortable" | Notes
! class="unsortable" | Ref
|-
| 1997
| Tokyo Weather
| Mizutani
|
|
|-
| 1998
| April Story
| Uzuki Nireno
|
|
|-
| 2003
| 9 Souls
| Yuki
| 
|
|-
| 2004
| The Hidden Blade
| Kie
|
|
|-
|rowspan=2| 2006
| The Uchoten Hotel
| Hana Takemoto
| 
|
|-
| Brave Story
| Wataru (voice)
|
|
|-
|rowspan=2| 2007
| Tokyo Tower: Mom and Me, and Sometimes Dad'
| Mizue
| 
|
|-
| Hero| Maiko Amamiya
|
|
|-
| 2008
| K-20: Legend of the Mask| Yoko Hashiba
|
|
|-
| 2009
| Villon's Wife| Sachi
|
|
|-
| 2010
| Confessions| Yuko Moriguchi
|
|
|-
|rowspan=3| 2011
| Someday| Mie Orii
| 
|
|-
| The Tale connecting a Life| Narrator
| Documentary
|
|-
| Imawano Kiyoshiro Naniwa Sullivan Show: Kando Saikō!!!| 
| Concert film
|
|-
| 2012
| Dreams for Sale| Satoko Ichizawa
|
|
|-
| 2014
| The Little House| Tokiko Hirai
|
|
|-
|rowspan=2| 2015
| A Farewell to Jinu| Akiko Amano
| 
|
|-
| Hero| Maiko Amamiya
| 
|
|-
| 2017
| Fireworks| Nazuna's mother
| Voice
|
|-
|rowspan=2| 2018
|Shottan, The Miracle| Yoshiko
|
|
|-
| It Comes| Kotoko Higa
| 
|
|-
| 2019
| Masquerade Hotel 
| Maki Nagakura
| 
|
|-
| 2020
| Last Letter| Yuri Kishibeno
| 
|
|-
|rowspan=2|2022
| The Pass: Last Days of the Samurai| Osuga
|
| 
|-
| The Zen Diary| Machiko
|
| 
|-
|}

 TV dramas 

 Japanese dub 

 Television 

 Video games 

 Theater 
  (Kabuki-za, 1993) - Ohisa
  (Shinbashi Enbujō, 1994) - Botan
  (Shinbashi Enbujō, 1994) - Omitsu
  (Shinbashi Enbujō, 1994) - Kikyō
  (Shinbashi Enbujō, 1994) - Oume
 Man of La Mancha
 (Aoyama Theater 1995) (Meitetsu Hall/ Aoyama Theatre, 1997) (Theater Hiten/ Aoyama Theatre, 1999) - Antonia
 (Hakata-za/ Imperial Garden Theater, 2002), (Meitetsu Hall/ Imperial Garden Theater, 2005), (Imperial Garden Theater, 2008), (Theater Brava!, 2009) - Aldonza
 Hamlet (Ginza Cezon Theater 1995, 1998, etc.) - Ophelia
  (Shinbashi Enbujō, 1999) - Tamako Taira
 The Good Person of Szechwan (New National Theater, 1999/ Akasaka ACT Theater 2001) - Shen Te/ Shui Ta
 Okepi (Aoyama Theatre, 2000) - Shinonome
 Voyage  (Theater Cocoon, 2000) - (lead role)
  (Parco Theater 2001) - Kaoru
 Wuthering Heights (Shinbashi Enbujō, 2002) - Catherine Earnshaw
 Mozart! (Nissei Theater; 2002) - Constanze Mozart
 Noda Map: Oil (Theater Cocoon, 2003/ Kintetsu Theater 2003) - Fuji
  (Shinbashi Enbujō, 2004) - Ohatsu
 Roningai (Aoyama Theatre, 2004) - Oshin
 Miss Saigon (Imperial Garden Theater, 2004) - Kim
 The Caucasian Chalk Circle (Setagaya Public Theater, 2005) - Gursha
 Noda Map: Fake Crime and Punishment (Theater Cocoon 2005–6, Theater Brava!, 2005–6) - Hanabusa Sanjo
 Metal Macbeth (Matsumoto Performing Arts Centre/ Aoyama Theatre/ Osaka Kosei Nenkin Kaikan, 2006) - Mrs. RandomStar
   (Theater Cocoon, 2007) - Joan of Arc
 Romance (Setagaya Public Theater, 2007) - Maria Chekhova
 Sisters (Parco Theater, 2008) - Kaoru Ozaki
 Noda Map: Piper (Theater Cocoon, 2009) - Deimos
 Jane Eyre (Nissei Theater, 2009, 2012) - Jane Eyre
  (Original title: Home and Beauty) (Theater Cocoon, 2010) - Victoria
 Twelfth Night (Theater Cocoon, 2011) - Sebastian/ Viola
  (New National Theatre, 2012–2013) - Sei
 (Theater Cocoon, 2014) - Trunk Jill
 (New National Theatre, 2015, 2017–2018) - Keiko
Noda Map:  (Tokyo Metropolitan Theatre, 2016) - Ningyo(Mermaid)
Metropolis (Theater Cocoon, 2016) - Maria/ Parody
(Tokyo Metropolitan Theatre, 2019) - Miko Tanaka/ Kazue Mori
Noda Map: Q: A Night At The Kabuki (Tokyo Metropolitan Theatre, 2019) - Sore kara no Julie(Juliet)
Inubito-Inujin-(イヌビト犬人)(New National Theatre, 2020) - Guide / Mazda Takeko / Petit
Pa Lapa Pan Pan  (COCOON PRODUCTION 2021＋大人計画『パ・ラパパンパン』2021) - novelist for teens

 Awards and prizes 

 Discography 

 Studio albums Sora no Kagami (1997)Ai no Tobira (1998)Itsuka, Sakura no Ame ni... (2000)A Piece of Life (2001)Home Grown (2003)Harvest Songs (2003)Bokura ga Ita (2006)Cherish You (2007)Time for Music (2009)Ashita wa Doko kara (2017)

 Compilation albums Five Years: Singles (2001)Takako Matsu Single Collection 1999–2005 (2006)Footsteps: 10th Anniversary Complete Best (2008)

 Live albums Takako Matsu Concert Tour Vol. 1 "A Piece of Life" (2002)Takako Matsu Concert Tour 2003 "Second Wave" (2004)

 Music Video/Concert DVD film Sora no Kagami (1997)Film Itsuka, Sakura no Ame ni… (2000)MATSU TAKAKO concert tour vol.1 "a piece of life" on film (2002)「tour documentary film "diary"」〜 concert tour vol.1 "apiece of life"〜 (2002)matsu takako concert tour 2003 "second wave" on film (2004)MATSU TAKAKO concert tour 2007 "I Cherish You" on film (2007)Takako Matsu Concert Tour 2010 "Time for Music"'' (2010)

Bibliography

References 

 "As I Discovered a New Myself in this Album, I Wish If New Listeners Find me" (Japanese), MSN, April 26, 2006, retrieved July 14, 2006
 "In-depth on an Unprecedented Collaboration with Sukima Switch" (Japanese), "Oricon", March 22, 2006, retrieved July 14, 2006
 "Natural and Certain Feeling" (Japanese), "Oricon", April 6, 2005, retrieved July 14, 2006

External links 
  
 Sony Music artist profile 
 
 
 

1977 births
Living people
Actresses from Tokyo
Horikoshi High School alumni
Japanese women pop singers
Japanese film actresses
Japanese stage actresses
Japanese television actresses
Japanese musical theatre actresses
Japanese voice actresses
Singers from Tokyo
Universal Music Japan artists
20th-century Japanese actresses
20th-century Japanese women singers
20th-century Japanese singers
21st-century Japanese actresses
21st-century Japanese women singers
21st-century Japanese singers